Juuko Mulwaana was Kabaka of the Kingdom of Buganda, between 1680 and 1690. He was the sixteenth (16th) Kabaka of Buganda.

Claim to the throne
He was the second son of Kabaka Kateregga Kamegere, Kabaka of Buganda between 1644 and 1674. His mother was Namutebi of the Mamba clan, the eighth (8th) wife of his father. He ascended the throne upon the demise of his elder brother around 1680. He established his capital at Ngalamye.

Married life
He married six (6) wives:

 Nabatanzi, daughter of Sebugulu, of the Lugave clan
 Nakimera, daughter of Kalanzi, of the Nsenene clan
 Nakisozi, daughter of Sekayiba, of the Mbogo clan
 Nalunga, daughter of Semaluulu, of the Nvuma clan
 Nandawula Kabengano, daughter of Nkata, of the Nsenene clan
 Nantume, daughter of Sekayiba, of the Mbogo clan

Issue
He fathered many children including:

 Prince (Omulangira) Batanzi, whose mother was Nabatanzi
 Prince (Omulangira) Kimera, whose mother was Nakimera
 Prince (Omulangira) Kisozi, whose mother was Nakisozi
 Prince (Omulangira) Lumweeno, whose mother was Nalunga
 Kabaka Ndawula Nsobya, Kabaka of Buganda, who reigned between 1724 and 1734, whose mother was Nandawula Kabengano
 Prince (Omulangira) Kasagazi, whose mother was Nantume
 Prince (Omulangira) Kyekaka.
 Princess (Omumbejja) Kagere

The final years
He died around 1690. No information is available as to the place or cause of his death. He is buried at Bujuuko, Busiro.

Succession table

See also
 Kabaka of Buganda

References

External links
List of the Kings of Buganda

Kabakas of Buganda
17th-century African people